Brian Thompson (born 9 February 1950) is an English former professional footballer who played as a midfielder in the Football League for Oxford United and Torquay United, in non-League football for Chelmsford City, and was on the books of Wolverhampton Wanderers without making a league appearance.

References

1950 births
Living people
People from Kingswinford
English footballers
Association football midfielders
Wolverhampton Wanderers F.C. players
Oxford United F.C. players
Torquay United F.C. players
Chelmsford City F.C. players
English Football League players